B&O Railroad Depot was one of several railroad stations in the city of Pittsburgh, Pennsylvania during the late 19th and early 20th century. The station was built in 1887, 16 years after the B&O Railroad opened its first railroad line into Pittsburgh. The station was built next to the Monongahela River. B&O railroad trains also used the Pittsburgh & Lake Erie Railroad Station for services that continued westward towards Chicago via the Pittsburgh & Lake Erie Railroad. In 1955 the station was demolished to make room for an interstate highway and remaining services were transferred to Grant Street Station. The building was designed by Frank Furness who also constructed the B&O Railroad's Philadelphia station.

At the time of its 1955 closing, major named long distance passenger trains making stops at the station included:
Ambassador
Capitol Limited
Columbian
Cleveland Night Express
Shenandoah
Washington–Chicago Express
Washingtonian

Additionally, the B&O operated a train from Pittsburgh to Buffalo via DuBois and East Salamanca.

Gallery

See also
Union Station (Pittsburgh)
Wabash Pittsburgh Terminal
Interstate 376 at the Smithfield Street Bridge

References

Pittsburgh
Railway stations in Pittsburgh
Railway stations in the United States opened in 1887
Railway stations closed in 1955
Frank Furness buildings
Buildings and structures demolished in 1955
Demolished railway stations in the United States
Demolished buildings and structures in Pittsburgh